The men's 56 kilograms event at the 2014 World Weightlifting Championships was held on 8 November 2014 in Baluan Sholak Sports Palace, Almaty, Kazakhstan.

Schedule

Medalists

Records

Results

References

Results 

2014 World Weightlifting Championships